The People Upstairs is a 2020 Spanish comedy film written and directed by Cesc Gay, starring Belén Cuesta and Javier Cámara.

The film was nominated for five Goya Awards and four Feroz Awards.

Plot 
Julio (Javier Cámara) and Ana (Griselda Siciliani) are a couple who spend most of their time arguing. One night, Ana decides to invite their upstairs neighbours, Salva (Alberto San Juan) y Laura (Belén Cuesta), for dinner, despite the fact that Julio is not their biggest fan, not least because of the noise they make while having sex. As the night goes on, various secrets about the couple come to light.

Cast
 Belén Cuesta as Laura
 Javier Cámara as Julio
 Alberto San Juan as Salva
 Griselda Siciliani as Ana

Reception
The People Upstairs received positive reviews from film critics. It holds a 100% approval rating on review aggregator website Rotten Tomatoes based on 9 reviews, with an average rating of 7.30/10.

Awards

References

External links
 
 

2020 comedy films
2020 films
Films directed by Cesc Gay
Spanish comedy films
2020s Spanish-language films
2020s Spanish films